Pelargoderus is a genus of beetle belonging to the family Cerambycidae.

List of species
 Pelargoderus albopunctatus Breuning, 1980
 Pelargoderus alcanor (Newman, 1842)
 Pelargoderus arouensis (Thomson, 1857)
 Pelargoderus assimilis Aurivillius, 1908
 Pelargoderus basalis (Gahan, 1907)
 Pelargoderus bipunctatus (Dalman, 1815)
 Pelargoderus celebensis Breuning, 1966
 Pelargoderus cincticornis Ritsema, 1895
 Pelargoderus dibbhincksi Gilmour, 1947
 Pelargoderus djampeanus Breuning, 1960
 Pelargoderus flavicornis Gahan, 1888
 Pelargoderus fulvoirroratus Blanchard, 1885
 Pelargoderus luteosparsus (Matsushita, 1935)
 Pelargoderus luzonicus (Breuning, 1935)
 Pelargoderus malaccensis Breuning, 1935
 Pelargoderus marginipennis Ritsema, 1895
 Pelargoderus niger (Thomson, 1878)
 Pelargoderus papuanus Breuning, 1936
 Pelargoderus rubropunctatus (Guérin-Méneville, 1838)
 Pelargoderus salomonum Breuning, 1962
 Pelargoderus semitigrinus Ritsema, 1885
 Pelargoderus sijthoffii Ritsema, 1901
 Pelargoderus stellatus Vitali & Casadio, 2007
 Pelargoderus sumatranus Breuning, 1935
 Pelargoderus trigonalis Heyden, 1897
 Pelargoderus vittatus Audinet-Serville, 1835
 Pelargoderus vitticollis Gressitt, 1952
 Pelargoderus waigeuensis Gilmour, 1956

References
 Biolib

 
Lamiini